This is a list of current New Zealand Defence Force bases.  For further detail and/or history please consult the more specific articles for NZ's three military arms – the Royal New Zealand Navy, New Zealand Army and Royal New Zealand Air Force

Royal New Zealand Navy
see also Naval bases of the Royal New Zealand Navy

RNZN bases
Devonport Naval Base, Auckland. Incorporates the Naval Support Command and HMNZS Philomel, which in turn incorporates the Naval College Tamaki (formerly HMNZS Tamaki).

Other RNZN facilities
Naval Communications Station Irirangi, near Waiouru, Central North Island.
Tamaki Leadership Centre, Whangaparaoa, Hibiscus Coast, Auckland.
Kauri Point Armament Depot, Birkenhead, Auckland
Fort Takapuna, Narrowneck Beach, Auckland
Naval Reserve units:
HMNZS Ngapona, Auckland.
Satellite unit, PHQ Tauranga, Tauranga.
HMNZS Olphert, Wellington.
HMNZS Pegasus, Christchurch.
HMNZS Toroa, Dunedin.

Former RNZN facilities
RNZN Stores Depot, Islington Bay, Rangitoto.
HMNZS Tamaki, Motuihe Island

New Zealand Army

Camps and Bases
Papakura Military Camp, Auckland.
Waiouru Military Camp, Waiouru.
Linton Military Camp, Palmerston North.
Trentham Military Camp, Wellington.
Burnham Military Camp, Christchurch.
Balmoral Military Camp, Tekapo.

Training Areas 

 New Zealand Special Air Service Battle Training Facility, Papakura.
 Waiouru Military Training Area, Waiouru.
West Melton Rifle Range, Christchurch.
 Tekapo Military Training Area, Tekapo.

Storage Facilities 

 Glentunnel Ammunition Depot.

Reserve Units 

 Hauraki Army Hall, Tauranga.
 Gisborne Army Hall, Gisborne.
 Whanganui Army Reserve Base, Whanganui. 
 Wellington Army Reserve Base, Petone.
 Nelson Army Hall, Nelson.
 Greymouth Army Hall, Greymouth.
 Cromwell Racecourse, Cromwell. 
 Kensington Barracks, Dunedin.
 Invercargill Army Centre, Invercargill.

Other NZ Army facilities

 QEII Army Memorial Museum, Waiouru.
 Point Jerningham Saluting Battery, Wellington.

Former NZ Army camps and facilities

Barracks and Camps 

 Addington Barracks, Christchurch.
 Alexandra Barracks, Wellington.
 Dieppe Barracks, Singapore.
 King Edward Barracks, Christchurch.
 Featherston Military Camp, Upper Hutt.
 Hopuhopu Military Camp.
 Mangaroa Military Camp, Upper Hutt.
 Matakana Military Camp, Matakana.
 Terendak Military Camp, Malaysia.
 Whangaparaoa Army Base.

Drill Halls 

 Hamilton Drill Hall, Knox Street, Hamilton.
 Masterton Drill Hall, Masterton.

Forts 

Fort Arthur, Nelson.
Fort Ballance, Wellington.
Fort Cautley, Auckland.
Fort Dorset, Wellington.
Fort Buckley, Wellington.
Fort Kelburne, Wellington.

Storage and Logistics 

Alexandra Magazines, Otago.
Belmont Magazines, Wellington.
Defence Stores Department, St Andrews Street, Dunedin (1907 to 1921).
Kelms Road Magazines, Ngāruawāhia.
Kaikorai Valley Magazines.
Mount Somers Magazines, Canterbury.

Other Facilities 
Land Force Command, Takapuna, Auckland
Mount Eden, Auckland
Mount Wellington, Auckland
Pattie Street, Petone
Mogadishu Airport, Somalia
Support Command, Palmerston North
Sylvia Park, Panmure, Auckland

Royal New Zealand Air Force

RNZAF bases
RNZAF Base Auckland, Whenuapai, Auckland.
RNZAF Base Ohakea, Bulls, Manawatū-Whanganui.
RNZAF Base Woodbourne, Blenheim, Marlborough.

Other RNZAF facilities
RNZAF Dip Flat, Nelson Lakes District.
Air Movements Rongotai, Wellington International Airport, Wellington.
Air Movements Harewood, Christchurch International Airport.
RNZAF Museum, Wigram, Christchurch.

Former RNZAF bases and facilities
RNZAF Base Hobsonville, Auckland
RNZAF Base Wigram, Christchurch
RNZAF Station Te Pirita
RNZAF Station Waipapakauri
RNZAF Station Wereroa
RNZAF Station Onerahi
RNZAF Base Shelly Bay
RNZAF Base Linton
No 1 Stores Depot
Te Rapa, Hamilton
Otahuhu, Auckland
No 2 Stores Depot
Mangaroa, Wellington
Gracefield, Wellington
Rongatai, Wellington
No 3 Stores Depot Weedons, Christchurch
No 4 Stores Depot Te Awamutu

Tri-service facilities
Headquarters New Zealand Defence Force, Central Wellington
Headquarters Joint Forces New Zealand, Trentham, Upper Hutt, Wellington.
Trentham Military Camp, Upper Hutt, Wellington.
Various NZDF Administrative and Recruiting centres throughout New Zealand
Hokowhitu Campus, Palmerston North, Manawatu.

See also
 List of former Royal New Zealand Air Force stations

References

www.nzdf.mil.nz
www.army.mil.nz

Military installations of New Zealand
Royal New Zealand Air Force
Royal New Zealand Navy
New Zealand Army
bases